The 1995 Barber Dodge Pro Series season was the eleventh season of the series. Dodge replaced Saab as the series engine provider. 1995 was also the first season the series was sanctioned by SCCA Pro Racing. All drivers used Dodge powered Goodyear shod Mondiale chassis. South African Jaki Scheckter won the championship.

Race calendar and results

Notes
 The Barber Dodge Pro Series would support the Trans-Am Series at the Dallas Grand Prix. But SCCA Pro Racing canceled the 1995 running of the Grand Prix. The Barber Dodge Pro Series race was moved to Texas World Speedway to support the IMSA GT Championship.

Final standings

References

Barber Dodge Pro Series
1995 in American motorsport